Pedrito de Andía's New Life (Spanish:La vida nueva de Pedrito de Andía) is a 1965 Spanish film directed by Rafael Gil and starring Joselito, Karin Mossberg and Carmen Bernardos.

Cast
 Joselito as Pedrito de Andía  
 Karin Mossberg as Isabel  
 Carmen Bernardos as Tía Clara  
 José María Seoane
Rafael Durán 
 Elena Duque 
 Lucía Prado
 Carlota Bilbao 
 Concha Goyanes as Edurne 
 Chonette Laurent
 María Jesús Corchero
 Soledad Gimeno 
 Jaime Blanch as William Adanson  
 María del Carmen González 
 Mer Casas
 Luis Induni 
 Ricardo Turia 
 Manuel Soriano 
 Fernando Alcaide 
 Carlos Hernán 
 María Jesús Balenciaga 
 Luis Ángel 'Pipo' Molia
 Lina Rosales

References

Bibliography 
 Bentley, Bernard. A Companion to Spanish Cinema. Boydell & Brewer 2008.

External links 
 

1965 films
Spanish comedy films
1960s Spanish-language films
Films directed by Rafael Gil
Suevia Films films
Films produced by Cesáreo González
1960s Spanish films